Mosel (A512) is the second ship of the s of the German Navy.

Development 

The Elbe-class replenishment ships are also known tenders of the German Navy. In German, this type of ship is called Versorgungsschiffe which can be translated as "supply ship" though the official translation in English is "replenishment ship". 

They are intended to support German naval units away from their home ports. The ships carry fuel, provisions, ammunition and other matériel and also provide medical services. The ships are named after German rivers where German parliaments were placed.

Construction and career 
Mosel was launched in April 1993 in Bremen-Vegesack, Germany. She was commissioned on 1 July 1993.

On 31 August 2013, Mosel and Rottweil visited Sevastopol.

Gallery

References

External links 

Elbe-class replenishment ships
1993 ships
Ships built in Bremen (state)